Kladivo (meaning Hammer in English) was a Slovene and German language cultural-political magazine published from Klagenfurt, Austria, from 1970 to 1989.

History and profile
Kladivo was founded by a group of Slovene student activists in 1970. The magazine was published by the Association of Friends of Kladivo (Verein der Freunde des Kladivo). It was a monthly, but publication was sometimes irregular.

Initially Kladivo had an anti-authoritarian socialist, but developed into a platform for Slovene intellectuals sympathizing with the Communist Party of Austria. As of 1980, Janko Malle was the editor-in-chief of the magazine.

References

1970 establishments in Austria
1989 disestablishments in Austria
Defunct magazines published in Austria
Defunct political magazines
German-language magazines
Magazines established in 1970
Magazines disestablished in 1989
Monthly magazines published in Austria
Mass media in Klagenfurt
Slovene-language magazines
Socialist magazines